The Chief Makhanda Regiment (formerly known as the First City) is a reserve air assault infantry regiment of the South African Army.

History

Colony Frontier
The regiment was formed from the First City Volunteers (FCV) of Grahamstown that were formed in 1875 in Grahamstown and the Queenstown Rifle Volunteers (QVR) that were formed in 1860 (Re-raised 1883) in Queenstown and these regiments were formed due to the unrest on the then frontier.

The QVR and the FCV fought in the Cape Frontier Wars and the 9th Frontier War (1877–1878). The QVR fought in the Morosi Campaign (1879). The FCV fought in the Basutoland Gun War (1880–1881). The QVR and the FCV later fought in the Bechuanaland campaign (1897), and in the Second Boer War (1899–1902).

Union Defence Force
On 1 July 1913, the QVR amalgamated with the FCV and was incorporated into the Citizen Force of the new Union Defence Force as the 4th Infantry (First Eastern Rifles). It served in German South-West Africa 1914–1915.

However, in 1924 the First Eastern Rifles were renamed the 4th Infantry (First City). The numerical part of the title was dropped in 1932, making the regiment simply First City.

In the mid-1930s, the regiment adopted Scottish uniform, including the Graham of Montrose tartan.

World War II
During World War II, FC served in the Madagascar campaign (1942). On 5 October 1943, First City, South Africa's senior Scottish unit, was temporarily "married up" with the Cape Town Highlanders to form the FC/CTH which was part of the 12th South African Motorised Brigade of the South African 6th Armoured Division. The "marriage" lasted until 8 May 1945. After completing its training in Egypt, the division landed at Taranto, Italy on 20 April 1944 and fought exclusively in Italy during its existence. In 1946, the regiment was reconstituted as a component of the country's part-time forces and reformed First City.

From 1954 to 1956, FC was amalgamated with the Kaffrarian Rifles, known as First City/Kaffrarian Rifles. In 1956 it reverted to being called First City.

Border War
The regiment served in the South African Border War from 1977 to 1986, and was also involved from 1983 until 1994 in Internal Operations.
The regiment was affiliated with 84 Motorised Brigade, part of 8th Armoured Division.

Post 1994
In 2004 it was decided to rebuild First City and by 2006 the regiment was training its own members as well as members of the Prince Alfred's Guard, The Buffalo Volunteer Rifles and Regiment Piet Retief these all being Eastern Cape regiments. Many members have also been trained in Air Assault. The Regiment has also sent members on UN & AU peace keeping missions to the DRC, Burundi and the Sudan.

2008 saw First City winning the trophy for the best reserve force regiment in the SA Army Infantry Formation. The regiment retained this award for 2009.

Name change
In August 2019, 52 Reserve Force units had their names changed to reflect the diverse military history of South Africa. The First City became the Chief Makhanda Regiment, and have 3 years to design and implement new regimental insignia.

Regimental symbols

Badges
Bonny Badge: silver crest of Montrose; directly behind the void areas of the badge on the Montrose tartan the following is worn:
Scarlet – officers and warrant officers
Blue – All other members
Maroon – All Airborne qualified members
The officers & WOs wear a diamond-shaped tartan backing, while the NCOs and Rfn wear a square tartan backing.
Cap badge backing (1935– ): Graham of Montrose tartan. 1935 to 1943 pale red hackle also worn.
 1943 to 1945 only a green and gold hackle was worn during this period. FC/CTH
 Collar badge: albany leopard on a branch
 Shoulder & epaulette title: "First City"
 Officers & WOs wear the gold metal epaulette designation on the red tab.
NCOs & Rfn wear a gold and green cloth shoulder title

Headdress
Blue Balmoral bonnet with blue and white dicing, with a red toorie in 1935. The regiment's Highland company wore a Tam o'shanter without the toorie from 1906 to 1913, while the pipers wore a dark blue Glengarry.
The new blue glengarry with blue and white dicing has the Maroon toorie to symbolise the regiment's airborne role. (Worn by officers & WOs)
The khaki tam o'shanter when worn by air assault members has a maroon toorie. (Worn by S/Sgt/Rfn)
The officers and WOs when in service/combat dress wear the light khaki balmoral.

Tartan
Graham of Montrose. The highland company was kilted in 1906, while the officers and warrant officers were allowed to wear trews from 1935 and the whole regiment was kilted in 1940.

Motto
New motto: "Expecto" (be alert/be prepared/I await)
 Old FCV Motto: Virtute et opera (By Virtue and Deeds)
 Old QVR Motto: Semper Paratus (Always Ready)

Current dress insignia

Alliances
 British: The Bedfordshire and Hertfordshire Regiment (from 1928 to 1958), then renamed The Royal Anglian Regiment (1958 to 1961).

Battle honours

Leadership

Notes

References 

Infantry regiments of South Africa
Military units and formations in Grahamstown
1875 establishments in the British Empire
Military history of South Africa
Military units and formations of the Second Boer War
Military units and formations of the British Empire
Military units and formations of South Africa in the Border War
Military units and formations established in 1875